Benito Raimundo Monfort Blanch, known in French as Benito R. de Monfort (1800-1871) was a Spanish photographer, publisher and businessman. He is most notable as the co-founder of both the Société héliographique and the casino de Biarritz. He was born in Valencia and died in Biarritz.

Sources
http://www.eshph.org/wp-content/uploads/2016/11/CHANZA.pdf

Spanish photographers
Spanish publishers (people)
19th-century Spanish businesspeople
People from Valencia
1800 births
1871 deaths